is an intercollegiate baseball league that features six prominent universities in the Tokyo area. Before the 1936 establishment of the Japanese Baseball League and subsequent growth (after 1950) of Nippon Professional Baseball, the Big6 League was widely considered the highest level of baseball in Japan.

Members

Hosei University
Established: 1915
All-Time Record: 1,204-880-121
League Championships: 46
Last Championship: Spring 2020

Keio University
Established: 1892
All-Time Record: 1,225-864-95
League Championships: 37
Last Championship: Autumn 2019

Meiji University
Established: 1910
All-Time Record: 1,254-851-109
League Championships: 40
Last Championship: Spring 2019

Rikkyo University
Established: 1874
All-Time Record: 947-1,146-100
League Championships: 13
Last Championship: Spring 2017

University of Tokyo
Established: 1917
All-Time Record: 253-1,672-57
League Championships: None
Last Championship: N/A

Waseda University
Established: 1901
All-Time Record: 1,306-776-90
League Championships: 46
Last Championship: Autumn 2020

Current as of Autumn 2020

History
The Tokyo Big6 Baseball League was established in 1925. It is also the origin of the Tokyo 6 Universities (Tōkyō roku daigaku) nickname that is given to the same six universities.

Games
All games are played at Meiji Jingu Stadium in Kasumigaoka, Shinjuku in downtown Tokyo. Games are known to be rowdy and celebratory, with male cheerleaders (応援団, Ōendan), cheerleaders and bands working themselves and the crowd into a frenzy.

Schedule and rules
The six teams play short, eight-weekend seasons in the spring and autumn of each year. Each team plays a short series against each of the five other teams in the league. The series format is similar to a three-game playoff, where the first to two wins is given a series victory. Home field is alternated, and all games are played at Meiji Jingu Stadium. Should a team sweep the first two games, the third game is not played.

The champion of the league is determined by the team with the most series victories. The champion team is given the Emperor's Cup. This is unique in Japan in that the other Emperor's cups are given to national champions in other sports such as Emperor's Cup of Football. The spring champion is allowed to participate in the All Japan University Baseball Championship Series while the fall champion is allowed to compete in the Meiji Jingu Stadium Tournament.

The league uses rules that are similar to the National and Central Leagues. The designated hitter rule is not used and the pitcher is required to bat. Also, unlike American university leagues, non-wood bats are banned.

Champions

Hosei University and Waseda University are tied for the most league championships with 46 each. Meiji University has won 40 times and Keio University has captured 37 league titles. Rikkyo trails with 13, while the University of Tokyo has yet to win a championship.

Current as of Autumn 2020

Rivalry

Waseda vs. Keio: Sōkeisen
The series between Waseda and Keio, attracts the most attention and is greatly enjoyed by the students, not least because it causes classes at both universities to be canceled. The game is still broadcast on NHK and it is the only series played during the last week of the season.

The Sōkeisen actually predates the establishment of the Tokyo Big6 League by over 20 years, beginning in 1903. The games often caused much tension between the two student bodies, often spilling out of the stadium and leading to the cancellation of games.

The addition of Meiji (1914), Hosei (1917) and Rikkyo (1921) would do little to remedy the rivalry. This state would continue until the addition of Tokyo Imperial University and the official establishment of the Tokyo Big6 Baseball League.

The name is a combination of the two university's names first kanji characters and the character for battle or match, .

Notable alumni

Hosei alumni
 Tadashi Wakabayashi (Hanshin Tigers → Mainichi Orions)
 Koichi Tabuchi (Hanshin Tigers → Seibu Lions)
 Koji Yamamoto (Hiroshima Toyo Carp)
 Suguru Egawa (Yomiuri Giants)
 Takehiko Kobayakawa (Hiroshima Toyo Carp → Yakult Swallows)
 Atsunori Inaba (Yakult Swallows → Hokkaido Nippon Ham Fighters)

Keio alumni
 Kaoru Betto (Hanshin Tigers / Ōsaka Tigers → Mainichi Orions)
 Motoshi Fujita (Yomiuri Giants)
 Yoshinobu Takahashi (Yomiuri Giants)

Meiji alumni
 Senichi Hoshino (Chunichi Dragons)
 Katsunori Nomura (Yakult Swallows → Hanshin Tigers → Yomiuri Giants → Tohoku Rakuten Golden Eagles)
 Kenshin Kawakami (Chunichi Dragons → Atlanta Braves)

Rikkyo alumni
 Shigeo Nagashima (Yomiuri Giants)
 Tadashi Sugiura (Nankai Hawks)
 Kazushige Nagashima (Yakult Swallows → Yomiuri Giants)
 Takeo Kawamura (Yokohama BayStars)
 Kazuhito Tadano (Cleveland Indians → Oakland Athletics)

Tokyo alumni
 Masatoshi Akihara (film director)
 Takeshi Shina (a member of the House of Representatives (Japan))
 Hirohisa Fujii (former Minister of Finance (Japan), a member of the House of Representatives (Japan))
 Kaoru Yosano (former Minister of Finance (Japan), a member of the House of Representatives (Japan))

Waseda alumni
 Haruyasu Nakajima (Yomiuri Giants)
 Tatsuro Hirooka (Yomiuri Giants)
 Akinobu Okada (Hanshin Tigers → Orix BlueWave / Orix Buffaloes)
 Hiroo Ishii (Kintetsu Buffaloes → Yomiuri Giants)
 Satoru Komiyama (Lotte Orions / Chiba Lotte Marines → Yokohama BayStars → New York Mets)
 Tsuyoshi Wada (Fukuoka Daiei Hawks / Fukuoka SoftBank Hawks → Norfolk Tides → Chicago Cubs)
 Norichika Aoki (Tokyo Yakult Swallows → Milwaukee Brewers → Kansas City Royals)
 Shugo Fujii (Tokyo Yakult Swallows)
 Shinichi Takeuchi (Tokyo Yakult Swallows)
 Hiroyasu Tanaka (Tokyo Yakult Swallows)
 Takashi Toritani (Hanshin Tigers)
 Daisuke Ochi (Yomiuri Giants)
 Yuki Saito (Hokkaido Nippon Ham Fighters)

Notes

External links
 Official Site of the Tokyo Big6 Baseball League (Japanese)

Baseball leagues in Japan
Sports leagues established in 1925
1925 establishments in Japan
College baseball